Melica decipiens is a species of grass that can be found in the mountains of Cordoba and San Luis provinces of Argentina.

Description
The leaf-sheaths are tubular and are closed on one end with the surface being glabrous. They are also scabrous, with the same goes for margins and surface while the apex is attenuate.

The pedicels are ciliate, curved, filiform, and hairy above. Its rhachilla have scaberulous internodes while the floret callus is glabrous. Its palea have ciliolated keels and is of the same length as fertile lemma. Flowers are fleshy, glabrous and truncate. They also have caryopsis with additional pericarp and linear hilum.

References

decipiens
Endemic flora of Argentina
Flora of South America